Kia Deh or Kiadeh or Keya Deh or Kiya Deh may refer to:

Kiadeh, Mazandaran
Kia Deh, Qazvin